The Upper Township School District is a comprehensive community public school district, serving students in pre-kindergarten through eighth grade from Upper Township, in Cape May County, New Jersey, United States. Students from Corbin City, a non-operating district, attend the district's schools as part of a sending/receiving relationship.

As of the 2021–22 school year, the district, comprised of three schools, had an enrollment of 1,404 students and 122.0 classroom teachers (on an FTE basis), for a student–teacher ratio of 11.5:1.

The district is classified by the New Jersey Department of Education as being in District Factor Group "FG", the fourth-highest of eight groupings. District Factor Groups organize districts statewide to allow comparison by common socioeconomic characteristics of the local districts. From lowest socioeconomic status to highest, the categories are A, B, CD, DE, FG, GH, I and J.

Students in public school for ninth through twelfth grades from Upper Township attend Ocean City High School in Ocean City as part of a sending/receiving relationship with the Ocean City School District, along with students from Corbin City, Longport and Sea Isle City. As of the 2021–22 school year, the high school had an enrollment of 1,231 students and 126.4 classroom teachers (on an FTE basis), for a student–teacher ratio of 9.7:1. About 60% of students in Ocean City High School are from Upper Township.

Schools
Schools in the district (with 2021–22 enrollment data from the National Center for Education Statistics) are:
Elementary schools
Upper Township Primary School with 497 students in grades PreK-2
Jamie Gillespie, Principal
Upper Township Elementary School with 408 students in grades 3-5
Andrea Urbano, Principal
Middle school
Upper Township Middle School with 485 students in grades 6-8
Jeff Leek, Principal

Administration
Core members of the district's administration are:
Christopher H. Kobik, Acting Superintendent
Laurie Ryan, Business Administrator / Board Secretary

Board of education
The district's board of education, comprised of nine members, sets policy and oversees the fiscal and educational operation of the district through its administration. As a Type II school district, the board's trustees are elected directly by voters to serve three-year terms of office on a staggered basis, with three seats up for election each year held (since 2012) as part of the November general election. The board appoints a superintendent to oversee the district's day-to-day operations and a business administrator to supervise the business functions of the district.

References

External links
Upper Township School District
 
School Data for the Upper Township School District, National Center for Education Statistics

Corbin City, New Jersey
Upper Township, New Jersey
New Jersey District Factor Group FG
School districts in Cape May County, New Jersey